Danila Dmitriyevich Yermakov (born 29 December 1998) is a Russian football player. He plays as a goalkeeper for FC Khimik-Avgust Vurnary.

Club career
He made his debut in the Russian Football National League for FC Spartak-2 Moscow on 17 July 2018 in a game against PFC Sochi.

References

External links
 
 Profile by Russian Football National League
 

1998 births
Sportspeople from Samara, Russia
Living people
Russian footballers
Association football goalkeepers
PFC Krylia Sovetov Samara players
FC Rostov players
FC Spartak-2 Moscow players
FC Fakel Voronezh players
FC Saturn Ramenskoye players
Russian First League players
Russian Second League players